Utsav Lal (born August 18, 1992) is an Indian pianist, educator, composer, and performing musician. Based out of New York, his work on the piano has been deeply influenced by Dhrupad and Indian classical music.

Biography 
Utsav Lal has performed several piano concerts with a repertoire of Indian ragas at venues including Carnegie Hall, New York, John F. Kennedy Center, Washington DC, India Habitat Centre, New Delhi, KonsertHuset, Sweden, Southbank Centre, London and others. Lal holds a Bachelors in Jazz from the Royal Conservatoire of Scotland, Glasgow and a Masters in Contemporary Improvisation from the New England Conservatory of Music, Boston. 
Lal won Ireland's MAMA Award (2008) for Multiculturalism in the individual category, Yamaha Jazz Scholar award (2014), TiE Aspire Young Indian Achiever Award (2012) and was named a Young Steinway Artist (2010) by piano-makers, Steinway & Sons.

Indian record label Times Music released his debut album Piano Moods of Indian Ragas in 2008. Subsequent album releases are "Ragas Dance off Piano Keys", "Ragas Al Pianoforte", "Ragas to Reels",  and a solo recording of ragas on the ”Fluid Piano”, released by the "Fluid Piano" tuning label (2016). Lal released his sixth album, "Indian Classical Music on the Piano", featuring tabla player Nitin Mitta in November 2018. He has collaborated with several Irish musicians including Martin Hayes & Dennis Cahill, Sam Comerford, Dave Sheridan, Winifred Horan,  and is recognised for his "Ragas to Reels"  concert tours that bring together Indian classical music and Traditional Irish music in a piano and flute combination. He has also performed in collaboration with Indian musicians including sitar player, Hidayat Hussain Khan, violinist, Sharat Chandra Srivastava, percussionists, Talvin Singh, Pt. Samir Chatterjee, and flautist, Rakesh Chaurasia. 

Utsav Lal is currently on the teaching faculty of Piano School of NYC  and has conducted several performance workshops at venues including Global Music Institute, India  and "Breaking Boundaries” workshop series in India  and USA.

See also
 Indians in the New York City metropolitan area

References

External links
 
 
 
 
 
 
 
 
 
 

Indian pianists
Indian classical pianists
1992 births
Living people
21st-century classical pianists